Mehdi Reza Ahmed (Arabic:مهدي رضا أحمد) (born 10 May 1990) is a Qatari footballer. He currently plays as a left back for Al Bidda.

Career
Mehdi Reza started his career at Al-Khor and is a product of the Al-Khor's youth system. On 29 November 2013, Mehdi Reza made his professional debut for Al-Khor against Al-Ahli in the Pro League, replacing Mohammed Al-Alawi .

External links

References

Living people
1990 births
Qatari footballers
Al-Khor SC players
Al Bidda SC players
Qatar Stars League players
Qatari Second Division players
Association football fullbacks
Place of birth missing (living people)